Tensho may refer to:
 Tenshō (Heian period) (天承), a Japanese era from 1131–1132
 Tenshō (Momoyama period) (天正), a Japanese era from 1573–1592
 Tensho (kata), a kata originating from Goju Ryu karate
  (born ), Japanese animation director
 1586 Tenshō earthquake, seismic event in Japan